Javier Fabián Toledo (born 24 April 1986 in Marcos Juárez, Córdoba) is an Argentine footballer who plays for Sarmiento.

Career
Toledo began his career in the youth side for Chacarita and in January 2005 he was promoted to the Primera División Argentina team. After two years he left Chacarita Juniors to sign in February 2007 with Club Atlético Sarmiento, here he played one year then signed in January 2008 with the Ecuadorian top club Deportivo Cuenca. He played in the Serie A de Ecuador a half year with Deportivo Cuenca and in summer 2008 returned to his youth club Chacarita Juniors. In summer 2009 he left Chacarita and signed with the Saudi Professional League team Al-Ahli (Jeddah). On 2 February 2010 the Argentinean striker signed with Paranaense until December 2010.

References

External links
 

1986 births
Living people
Sportspeople from Córdoba Province, Argentina
Argentine footballers
Argentine expatriate footballers
Club Atlético Sarmiento footballers
Rosario Central footballers
Al-Ahli Saudi FC players
Colo-Colo footballers
C.D. Cuenca footballers
Chacarita Juniors footballers
Lobos BUAP footballers
Club Sol de América footballers
San Martín de San Juan footballers
Estudiantes de La Plata footballers
Argentine Primera División players
Primera Nacional players
Primera B Metropolitana players
Chilean Primera División players
Saudi Professional League players
Uruguayan Primera División players
Ecuadorian Serie A players
Paraguayan Primera División players
Expatriate footballers in Saudi Arabia
Expatriate footballers in Ecuador
Expatriate footballers in Chile
Expatriate footballers in Brazil
Expatriate footballers in Uruguay
Expatriate footballers in Paraguay
Expatriate footballers in Mexico
Argentine expatriate sportspeople in Saudi Arabia
Argentine expatriate sportspeople in Chile
Argentine expatriate sportspeople in Ecuador
Argentine expatriate sportspeople in Brazil
Association football forwards
Argentine expatriate sportspeople in Uruguay
Argentine expatriate sportspeople in Paraguay
Argentine expatriate sportspeople in Mexico